Gorakhpur is a city in the Indian state of Uttar Pradesh, along the banks of the Rapti river  in the  Purvanchal region. It is situated 272 kilometers east of the state capital Lucknow. It is the administrative headquarters of Gorakhpur district, North Eastern Railway Zone and Gorakhpur division. The city is home to the Gorakhnath Math, a Gorakhnath temple. The city also has an Indian Air Force station, since 1963. Gita Press, the world's largest publisher of Hindu religious texts like Ramayana and Mahabharat is also located in Gorakhpur which was established here in 1926.

Etymology
The name "Gorakhpur" comes from the Sanskrit Gorakshapuram, which means abode of Gorakhnath, a renowned ascetic who was a prominent saint of the Nath Sampradaya.

Geography

Gorakhpur is situated about 100 km from the Nepal border, 193 km from Varanasi, 260 km from Patna and 270 km from Lucknow. It is one of the flood vulnerable districts in Eastern Uttar Pradesh. Data over the past 100 years show a considerable increase in the intensity and frequency of floods, with extreme events occurring every three to four years. Roughly 20% of the population is affected by floods, which are an annual occurrence in some areas, causing huge loss of life, health, and livelihoods for the poor inhabitants, as well as damage to public and private property.

Gorakhpur is situated on the bank's of Rapti river which is a tributary of Ghabra river. A fairly large lake Ramgarh Tal Lake is also situated in the eastern part of the city.

Climate
The Köppen climate classification subtype for this climate is Cwa (dry-winter humid subtropical climate).

Demographics

As of 2011 Indian Census, Gorakhpur had a total population of 673,446, of which 353,907 were males and 319,539 were females. It has a sex ratio of 903 females per 1000 males. The population within the age group of 0 to 6 years was 69,596. Gorakhpur had a literacy rate of 75.2%, of which male literacy was 79.4% and female literacy was 70.6%. The effective literacy rate of the 7+ population of Gorakhpur was 83.9%, of which the male literacy rate was 88.7% and the female literacy rate was 78.6%. The Scheduled Castes and Scheduled Tribes population was 62,728 and 2,929, respectively. Gorakhpur had 112,237 households in 2011.

According to a 2020 report, 31 villages have been incorporated in the municipal corporation limits increasing the population to over 1 million. The city area has also increased from 145.5 km2 in 2011 to 226.6 km2.

The state government has also declared Gorakhpur,as a metropolis on 22 November 2021. Apart from Gorakhpur Municipal Corporation, the government has declared three nagar panchayats and eight development blocks as a metropolitan area. For this, the urban Development Department has issued a notification to the city. According to the order issued by the Additional Chief Secretary, Urban Development, now in Gorakhpur Metropolitan Region, Municipal Corporation, Nagar Panchayat Pipraich, Nagar Panchayat PPganj, Nagar Panchayat Mundera Bazar, Chargawa, Khorabar, Pipraich, Sardar Nagar, Piprauli, Jungle Kaudiya, Campierganj and The entire area of Bhathat development block has been covered. After this the population of Gorakhpur metropolis will be around 25 lakhs.

Transport

Railways

Gorakhpur is connected through a rail network and Gorakhpur railway station. Until March 2021, it had world's longest platform of 1366 meters. In February 2020, 100 flowering pots with the support structures were made and installed on the hydrant pipe at platform No.2 to increase the plantation and natural cover, using local resources of the Gorakhpur coaching depot.

The station offers Class A-1 railway station facilities.

Gorakhpur is the headquarters of North Eastern Railways.

Air

An Air Force station of Indian Air Force was established in Gorakhpur in 1963 named Mahayogi Gorakhnath Airport and extended for public air transport.

Metro

Gorakhpur Metro is a light metro project with 2 line and 27 stations is light rail transit (LRT) system approved to be built in Gorakhpur. It consist two corridors covering a distance of 27.84 km.
On 1 December 2021 the central government has also approved the DPR of Gorakhpur light metro project.

Education

Gorakhpur has 4 universities, namely, Deen Dayal Upadhyay Gorakhpur University, Madan Mohan Malaviya University of Technology, Maha Yogi Guru Gorakhnath Ayush University, Mahayogi Gorakhnath University, a private university. One medical college named Baba Raghav Das Medical College and AIIMS Gorakhpur  and a sports college named Veer Bahadur Singh Sports College. The state's first Hotel Management Institute has also been unveiled and would be known as State Institute of Hotel Management. Also, four private engineering / pharmacy / management college,ITM,KIPM,BIT, GIDA & SIT, Gorakhpur which is affiliated with Dr. A.P.J. Abdul Kalam Technical University, Lucknow. It also has a dental institute named as Purvanchal Institute Of Dental Science in gida, gorakhpur.

Sports
Veer Bahadur Singh Sports College, Gorakhpur
Syed Modi Railway Stadium

Notable people
 
 
 Yogi Adityanath, 21st and current Chief Minister of Uttar Pradesh
 Leopold Amery, British Cabinet Minister
 Premindra Singh Bhagat, recipient of Victoria Cross
 Ram Upendra Das, economist
 Amrapali Dubey, actress
 Ravi Dubey, actor
 Mahmood Farooqui, Indian writer, artist and director
 Bilal Haq, geo-scientist and poet 
 Firaq Gorakhpuri, Indian Urdu writer
 Majnun Gorakhpuri, Pakistani short story writer, poet and literary critic
 Narendra Hirwani, international cricket player
 Anurag Kashyap, filmmaker
 Kafeel Khan, physician
 Ravi Kishan, Member of Parliament from Gorakhpur Lok Sabha constituency
 Syed Modi, badminton player, Winner of Arjuna Award
 Vidya Niwas Mishra, Hindi-Sanskrit littérateur, and a journalist
 Mahendra Nath Mulla, MVC, officer of the Indian Navy
 Jamuna Nishad, Indian politician
 Praveen Kumar Nishad, Indian politician
 Sanjay Nishad, politician, founder of NISHAD Party
 Kamlesh Paswan, politician and Member of Parliament, 17th Lok Sabha
 Subrata Roy, Indian businessman, founder of Sahara India Pariwar
 Asit Sen, Bollywood actor
 Jimmy Shergill, actor
 Saurabh Shukla, actor
 Shri Prakash Shukla, Indian contract killer
 Shiv Pratap Shukla, Indian politician and social worker
 Amar Shahid Bandhu Singh, freedom fighter
 Kedarnath Singh, poet, critic
 Lilavati Singh, educator
 Vir Bahadur Singh, former Chief Minister of Uttar Pradesh
 Prem Maya Sonir, hockey player
 Hari Shankar Tiwari, Indian politician
 Amarmani Tripathi, Indian politician
 Paramahansa Yogananda, yoga guru, founder of Self-Realization Fellowship/Yogoda Satsanga Society of India
 Tabassum Mansoor, Indian educationist in Libya

See also
 Gorakhpur Cantonment railway station
 Ramgarh Tal Lake

Notes

References

External links
Gorakhpur Municipal Government (NIC)
Uttar Pradesh Government District NIC

 
Cities and towns in Gorakhpur district
Cities in Uttar Pradesh